The 2015 Season was NorthEast United's 2nd season in existence in the Indian Super League.

Transfers

Pre-season

In:

Out:

During the season

In:

Out:

Squad

Injured

Technical staff

Indian Super League

League table

Results summary

Results by round

Matches

Squad statistics

Appearances and goals

|-
|colspan="14"|Players who left NorthEast United due to injury during the season:

|}

Goal scorers

Disciplinary record

References

NorthEast United FC seasons
NorthEast United